The Vălărița is a left tributary of the river Cerna in Romania. It flows into the Cerna in Toplița.

References

Rivers of Romania
Rivers of Hunedoara County